Haley Chan Hiu-yi, known professionally as Hana Kuk Tsz-kiu (born 17 May 1982 or 24 November 1986), is a Hong Kong singer-songwriter currently managed by PanAsiaCC and TVB Music Group, debuted in 2016. Her Chinese stage name was voted by fans.

Early life 
Her parents divorced at a young age and she lived with her younger sister. Due to financial and family problems, she dropped out of school at 13 to earn a living, she later returned to her studies at age 20. Prior to returning to school, she took up multiple jobs including being an apprentice at a beauty salon, Photography assistant, and makeup artist.

Career

2008-2016: Career beginning 
She had been the lead vocal as Haley Xc in Pleasure Garden in 2008. In 2014, she participated Super M as Chan Hiu Yi, Super Star and Hot Door Night.

In 2016, she was debuted as a female singer-songwriter under PanAsiaCC through the recommendation of Addison from ZEN. In July, she released the single "Today's Me" which performed good on the charts. Later, she has released two singles, "Fool in the Fairy Tale"  and "Seven Years Old". Because of the commercial success of these singles, she has received Best New Artist awards from several shows.

2017-2020: Forgot Myself, Last Forever, and Can't Let You Go 
In 2017, she signed a record deal with Voice Entertainment. After that, her first single from Voice Entertainment, "Lifetime Waiting", charted number 1 on Jade Solid Gold for two weeks. "Forgot Myself", the ending theme song from Line Walker: The Prelude hit 100,000 views on the first day of its release. In November, after 2 months of its release, it had over 4 million views online. On 3 November, she has released her debut solo album, Forgot Myself. In 2018, most of her singles has reached 1M views. Back to the Day We Met and Flying Into The Flame are even the 5th and the 7th most popular Cantonese song on YouTube in 2018. On 30 September, "Forgot Myself" has reached over 10M views on YouTube. The video takes one year and 11 days to reach 10 million views. She became the second female artist from Voice Entertainment to have owned a 10M video on YouTube. In December, she released her second solo album, Last Forever.

Her first concert was held in August 2019 in KITEC. In December, she released her third solo album Can't Let You Go.

2021: First Non-Cameo, Non-Extra Role as an Actress 
Starting in 2018, Hana began making guest appearances in TVB dramas. In 2021, she took on a supporting role in Murder Diary, her first non-cameo, non-extra role.

Discography

Studio albums

Singles

Soundtrack appearance

Filmography

Television dramas (TVB)

Writing Credits

Awards and nominations

Note

References 

1980s births
Living people
21st-century Hong Kong women singers
Hong Kong television actresses